The South Carolina Gamecocks represent the University of South Carolina in the NCAA Division I.

The University of South Carolina uses "Gamecocks" as its official nickname and mascot.  While the men's teams were traditionally known as the Fighting Gamecocks and the women's teams were previously known as the Lady Gamecocks, this distinction was discontinued in part to eliminate any gender bias in the athletic department and in part to counter misconceptions about the gamecock mascot endorsing bloodsport.

All of the University's varsity teams compete at the Division I level of the NCAA, and all but men's soccer and women's beach volleyball compete in the Southeastern Conference. Men's soccer competes in the Sun Belt Conference and women's beach volleyball competes in the Coastal Collegiate Sports Association because the SEC does not sponsor those sports.

The athletic department is supported with private money from the Gamecock Club. It was originally formed as the B.A.M. ("Buck-A-Month") Club in 1939 and 1940 to benefit the athletic programs from privately raised funds.

The university's athletic programs have earned eleven national team titles and produced many Olympians. Tim Brando (formerly of CBS Sports) was quoted as saying, "You won't find any more loyal fans in the country than those who follow the South Carolina Gamecocks."

Athletics history

Nickname and colors 
"Garnet and black" have been used by the University of South Carolina as its colors ever since the family of J. William Flinn presented a banner composed of those colors to the football team in November 1895, although there was no official adoption of the colors at that time. In 1900, the football team was first referred to as the "Gamecocks" by The State newspaper. The nickname was a reference to the fighting tactics of General Thomas Sumter, the Revolutionary War hero known as the Fighting Gamecock. Given that garnet and black were already in use and also the dominant colors on a gamecock, the university gradually adopted "Gamecocks" and "garnet and black" as the official nickname and colors for its athletic teams.

Conference history 
The University of South Carolina was a member of the Southern Conference for men's basketball and football from 1922 until it became a founding member of the Atlantic Coast Conference in 1953. The Gamecocks officially withdrew from the ACC on June 30, 1971, the result of football head coach Paul Dietzel opposing a conference rule that required a minimum 800 Scholastic Aptitude Test (SAT) score when awarding athletic scholarships. USC then competed as an independent until 1983 when it joined the Metro Conference for all sports except football (which the Metro did not sponsor) and men's soccer. In 1991, the Gamecocks joined the Southeastern Conference when it increased its membership to 12 schools and split into two divisions. Since joining the SEC, the Gamecocks have been part of the league's East Division.

Men's soccer continued to compete as an independent since the SEC does not sponsor men's soccer, but joined the Metro Conference for the 1993 and 1994 seasons and competed in Conference USA from 2005 to 2021. After that season, South Carolina, along with fellow SEC member Kentucky (the only other SEC member with varsity men's soccer), moved that sport to the Sun Belt Conference. Women's beach volleyball competed as an independent before joining the Coastal Collegiate Sports Association for the 2016 season (2015–16 school year).

Sports sponsored 

South Carolina sponsors team in 8 men's and 11 women's NCAA sanctioned sports. All programs compete in the Southeastern Conference with the exception of the men's soccer program which competes in the Sun Belt Conference and the women's beach volleyball program competes in the Coastal Collegiate Sports Association.

Football

The South Carolina Gamecocks football team represents the University of South Carolina and competes in the Football Bowl Subdivision of the NCAA and the Eastern Division of the Southeastern Conference. The team plays its home games at Williams-Brice Stadium, the 20th largest stadium in college football.  Accomplishments include the 2010 SEC East title, the 1969 ACC championship, and numerous bowl victories and top 25 rankings. In 1980, George Rogers won the Heisman Trophy. Players inducted into the College Football Hall of Fame include George Rogers and Sterling Sharpe. The current head coach is Shane Beamer.

Men's basketball

The South Carolina Gamecocks men's basketball team represents the University of South Carolina and competes in the Southeastern Conference (SEC). The Gamecocks won Southern Conference titles in 1927, 1933, 1934, and 1945, and then they gained national attention under hall of fame coach Frank McGuire, posting a 205–65 record from 1967 to 1976, which included the 1970 Atlantic Coast Conference (ACC) championship, 1971 ACC Tournament title, and four consecutive NCAA tournament appearances from 1971 to 1974. The program also won the 1997 SEC championship, National Invitation Tournament (NIT) titles in 2005 and 2006, and a share of the 2009 SEC Eastern division title. Most recently, the Gamecocks won the 2017 NCAA East Regional Championship, reaching the Final Four for the first time in school history.  Lamont Paris is the current head coach, and the team plays at the 18,000-seat Colonial Life Arena.

Women's basketball

The South Carolina Gamecocks women's basketball team represents the University of South Carolina and competes in the Southeastern Conference. During the 1980s, the Gamecocks won five regular season Metro Conference championships and three conference tournament championships. Under their current head coach, 3-time olympic gold medalist Dawn Staley, the program continues to build on their accomplishments, winning the SEC regular season championship 4 years in a row (2014–2017) and the SEC tournament championship 3 years in a row (2015–2017). Under Staley, the Gamecocks have earned a #1 seed in the NCAA Tournament 4 consecutive seasons (2014–2017). The 2015 season also saw the team win its first out of two NCAA regional championships (2015, 2017) and advance to the Final Four for the first time in school history. Most recently, the Gamecocks won the 2017 NCAA Division I women's basketball tournament National Championship, marking the first ever National Championship that the men's or women's program has ever won in school history. The Gamecocks share a home with the South Carolina men's basketball team at the 18,000-seat Colonial Life Arena.

Baseball

The South Carolina Gamecocks baseball team represents the University of South Carolina in NCAA Division I college baseball.  South Carolina has posted 29 NCAA Tournament appearances, 11 College World Series berths, and two National Championships: 2010 and 2011.  Since joining the Southeastern Conference in 1992, the team has competed in the Eastern division, where they have won seven divisional titles, three regular season conference championships (2000, 2002, 2011) and one SEC Tournament championship (2004).  Mark Kingston is the current head coach. Between 2010 and 2012 the Gamecocks set two NCAA records for postseason success: the most consecutive NCAA tournament wins (22) and the most consecutive wins in the College World Series (12). The team plays its home games at Carolina Stadium (Founders Park), which opened on February 21, 2009.

Women's track and field

The South Carolina Gamecocks women's track and field team represents the University of South Carolina and competes in the SEC, where they have won three conference championships (1999, 2002, 2005).  The team has been coached by Curtis Frye since 1997, won the 2002 NCAA Women's Division I Outdoor Track and Field Championship, and includes many Olympic medalists, such as Aleen Bailey, Natasha Hastings, and Tonique Williams-Darling.

† ordered by revenue contribution to USC Athletic Department in FY2012.

Notable non-varsity sports

Club Rugby
Founded in 1967, the University of South Carolina rugby team is the oldest club sport at the school. The team plays Division 1 college rugby in the Southeastern Collegiate Rugby Conference against its SEC rivals. The rugby team finished second in the SCRC conference in 2013 and reached the national playoffs. The team improved and finished first in the SCRC conference in 2014, again qualifying for the national playoffs.

South Carolina rugby offers scholarships to certain athletes of up to $60,000 over a four-year period. The rugby team is supported by the Carolina Rugby Foundation and by the Carolina Men's Rugby Endowment Fund. The rugby team has been led since 2011 by head coach Mark Morris.

Men's Club Lacrosse

The Gamecocks Men's Club Lacrosse team won the MCLA Division 1 National Championships in 2019 and 2022.

Club Baseball 
Founded in 2015, the South Carolina Club Baseball team competes in Division 1 of the National Club Baseball Association. The team finished first in the South Atlantic Conference's Eastern Region in 2020 and 2022. In 2020, then-school president Robert Caslen recognized the team, and pledged to host an ice cream party for the team as a reward for sweeping rival Clemson University in a two-game series in Columbia.

Titles, coaches, and facilities
The Gamecocks have won eleven national team championships: 2017 & 2022 NCAA Championship in women's basketball; 2010 & 2011 NCAA Championships in baseball; 2002 NCAA Championship in women's outdoor track & field; 2005, 2007, and 2015 National Championships in women's equestrian; and 2005, 2006, and 2007 Hunt Seat National Championships in women's equestrian.  Also, the men's and women's track & field teams have produced many NCAA individual champions, world championship medalists, and Olympic medalists.  The baseball and basketball teams have also produced Olympic medalists. Other significant accomplishments include 2010 SEC Eastern Division Champions in football, NCAA runner-up four times in women's track & field (2000, 2001, 2003, 2005), NCAA runner-up four times in baseball (1975, 1977, 2002, 2012), 1993 NCAA runner-up in men's soccer, 2005 & 2006 NIT champions in men's basketball, and the 1980 Heisman Trophy winner George Rogers.

Gamecocks in the Olympics

Baseball
 Adam Everett (2000, United States, Shortstop, Gold Medal)

Men's Basketball
 Kevin Joyce (1972, United States, Guard, Silver Medal)
 Marijonas Petravicius (2008, Lithuanian, Center)

Women's Basketball
 Laeticia Amihere (2020, Canada)
 Ilona Burgrova (2012, Czech Republic, Center)
 Allisha Gray (2020, United States, 3x3)
 Shannon Johnson (2004, United States, Point Guard, Gold Medal)
 Iva Sliskovic (2012, Croatia)
 A'ja Wilson (2020, United States)

Men's Swimming & Diving
 Alex Alexander (1964, Australia, Individual Medley)
 Jean-Marie Arnould (1988, Belgium, Freestyle)
 István Batházi (1996, 2000, & 2004; Hungary; Individual Medley)
 Tamas Batházi (2004, Hungary)
 Gary Binfield (1988, Great Britain)
 Javier Botello (2000, Spain)
 Zsolt Gaspar (2000 & 2004, Hungary, Butterfly)
 Rik Leishman (1992, Great Britain, Butterfly)
 Tamás Szűcs (2004, Hungary, Freestyle)
 Akaram Mahmoud (2016, Egypt, Freestyle)

Women's Swimming & Diving
 Vivian Alberty (1996, Puerto Rico, Diving)
 Isabelle Arnould (1988, Belgium, Freestyle)
 Shelly Cramer (1976 & 1980, Virgin Islands)
 Michelle Davison (2000, United States, Diving)
 Sharntelle McLean (2004 & 2008, Trinidad and Tobago, Freestyle)
 Anna Nyiry (1996, Hungary)
 Tracey Richardson (2004, Great Britain, 3 Meter Springboard)
 Heather Roffey (2004, Cayman Islands, Freestyle & Butterfly)
 Julia Vincent (2016, South Africa, 3 Meter Springboard)

Men's Track & Field
 Leroy Dixon (2008, United States, 4 × 100 Meter Relay)
 Adrian Durant (2004; Virgin Islands; 100 Meters, 200 Meters, & 4 × 100 Meter Relay)
 Otis Harris (2004, United States; 400 Meters, Silver Medal; 4 × 400 Meter Relay, Gold Medal)
 Rodney Martin (2008, United States, 4 × 100 Meter Relay)
 Jason Richardson (2012, United States, 110 Meter Hurdles, Silver Medal)
 Brad Snyder (1996, 2000, & 2004; Canada; Shot Put)
 Terrence Trammell (2000, 2004, & 2008; United States; 110 Meter Hurdles; 2000 & 2004 Silver Medals)
 Marvin Watts (2000, Jamaica, 800 Meters)

Women's Track & Field
 Aliyah Abrams (2016, Guyana, 400 Meters)
 Aleen Bailey (2004 & 2008, Jamaica, 4 × 100 Meter Relay, 2004 Gold Medal)
 Miki Barber (2000, United States, 4 × 400 Meter Relay)
 Kierre Beckles (2016, Barbados, 100 Meter Hurdles)
 Lashinda Demus (2004 & 2012, United States, 400 Meter Hurdles, 2012 Silver Medal)
 Dawn Ellerbe (2000, United States, Hammer Throw)
 Michelle Fournier (2000 & 2004, Canada, Hammer Throw)
 Chelsea Hammond (2008, Jamaica, Long Jump)
 Natasha Hastings (2008, 2012, & 2016, United States, 4 × 400 Meter Relay, 2008 Gold Medal)
 Charmaine Howell (2000, Jamaica, 4 × 400 Meter Relay, Silver Medal)
 Mechelle Lewis (2008, United States, 4 × 100 Meter Relay)
 Lisa Misipeka (1996, 2000, & 2004, American Samoa, Hammer Throw & Shot Put)
 Jeannelle Scheper (2016, St. Lucia, High Jump)
 Shevon Stoddart (2004 & 2008, Jamaica, 400 Meter Hurdles)
 Tiffany Williams (2008, United States, 400 Meter Hurdles)
 Tonique Williams-Darling (2000 & 2004, The Bahamas, 400 Meters, 2004 Gold Medal)

Championships

NCAA team championships

South Carolina has won 5 NCAA team national championships.

Men's (2)
Baseball (2): 2010, 2011
Women's (3)
Outdoor track and field  (1): 2002
Basketball (2): 2017, 2022
see also
SEC NCAA team championships
List of NCAA schools with the most NCAA Division I championships

Other national team championships
Below are the 6 National team titles that were not bestowed by the NCAA:

 Women's
Equestrian (6): NCEA Hunt Seat National Champions: 3 (2007, 2006, 2005)NCEA National Champions: 3 (2015, 2007, 2005)

Rivalries

South Carolina's foremost rival is Clemson University. A heated rivalry continues to this day for a variety of reasons, including the historic tensions regarding their respective charters along with the passions surrounding their athletic programs. The annual South Carolina-Clemson football game is the longest uninterrupted series in the South and the third longest uninterrupted series overall, first played in 1896 (four years after South Carolina's inaugural season), and played every year from 1909 to 2019. The 2020 football game did not occur due to scheduling amidst the COVID-19 pandemic, but the rivalry is scheduled to continue for the 2021 football season. Their baseball programs consistently qualify for the NCAA playoffs and frequently earn berths to the Men's College World Series in Omaha, Nebraska.

South Carolina continues to develop rivalries with other members of the SEC's East Division. South Carolina's main SEC rival has been the University of Georgia due to its proximity and the many years of competition before the Gamecocks joined the SEC. The "Halloween Game" against the University of Tennessee has the potential to be a big football game every year. Another notable rivalry within the East Division is the Gamecocks' men's soccer rivalry with the University of Kentucky. The only two SEC members that sponsor varsity men's soccer have played in the same conference since 2005, first in Conference USA and now in the Sun Belt Conference, with their games known as the SEC Derby.

When South Carolina was a member of the ACC (1953–1971), there was an intense rivalry with the University of North Carolina, particularly in basketball, since Frank McGuire had coached UNC but moved to Columbia to coach the Gamecocks. The rivalry was renewed in football during the 2007 season, with the Gamecocks defeating the Tar Heels 21–15.

References

External links